Ngakuru  is a rural community in Rotorua Lakes District within the Waikato region of New Zealand's North Island.

Demographics
Ngakuru is in three SA1 statistical areas which cover . The SA1 areas are part of the Ngakuru statistical area.

The SA1 areas had a population of 303 at the 2018 New Zealand census, a decrease of 33 people (−9.8%) since the 2013 census, and a decrease of 39 people (−11.4%) since the 2006 census. There were 114 households, comprising 150 males and 156 females, giving a sex ratio of 0.96 males per female, with 66 people (21.8%) aged under 15 years, 66 (21.8%) aged 15 to 29, 147 (48.5%) aged 30 to 64, and 30 (9.9%) aged 65 or older.

Ethnicities were 91.1% European/Pākehā, 16.8% Māori, 2.0% Pacific peoples, and 3.0% Asian. People may identify with more than one ethnicity.

Although some people chose not to answer the census's question about religious affiliation, 66.3% had no religion, 24.8% were Christian and 2.0% had other religions.

Of those at least 15 years old, 42 (17.7%) people had a bachelor's or higher degree, and 30 (12.7%) people had no formal qualifications. 45 people (19.0%) earned over $70,000 compared to 17.2% nationally. The employment status of those at least 15 was that 135 (57.0%) people were employed full-time, 42 (17.7%) were part-time, and 9 (3.8%) were unemployed.

Ngakuru statistical area

Ngakuru had a population of 1,770 at the 2018 New Zealand census, an increase of 75 people (4.4%) since the 2013 census, and an increase of 69 people (4.1%) since the 2006 census. There were 639 households, comprising 903 males and 867 females, giving a sex ratio of 1.04 males per female. The median age was 36.6 years (compared with 37.4 years nationally), with 393 people (22.2%) aged under 15 years, 366 (20.7%) aged 15 to 29, 837 (47.3%) aged 30 to 64, and 174 (9.8%) aged 65 or older.

Ethnicities were 87.8% European/Pākehā, 20.5% Māori, 1.7% Pacific peoples, 2.4% Asian, and 2.7% other ethnicities. People may identify with more than one ethnicity.

The percentage of people born overseas was 13.9, compared with 27.1% nationally.

Although some people chose not to answer the census's question about religious affiliation, 57.3% had no religion, 31.9% were Christian, 1.9% had Māori religious beliefs, 0.2% were Hindu, 0.2% were Buddhist and 1.0% had other religions.

Of those at least 15 years old, 207 (15.0%) people had a bachelor's or higher degree, and 228 (16.6%) people had no formal qualifications. The median income was $40,700, compared with $31,800 nationally. 300 people (21.8%) earned over $70,000 compared to 17.2% nationally. The employment status of those at least 15 was that 822 (59.7%) people were employed full-time, 249 (18.1%) were part-time, and 30 (2.2%) were unemployed.

Education

References

Rotorua Lakes District
Populated places in Waikato